The Family Closet is a 1921 American silent mystery film directed by John B. O'Brien and starring Holmes Herbert, Alice Mann and Kempton Greene.

Cast
 Holmes Herbert as Alfred Dinsmore
 Alice Mann as Louise Dinsmore
 Kempton Greene as Ned Tully
 Byron Russell as J. Wesley Tully
 Josephine Frost as Mrs. Tully
 Walter Ware as Charles Purcell
 John Webb Dillion as Denis J. McMurty 
 Verne Layton as Lowell Winthrope
 Walter P. Lewis as John Colby 
 May Kitson as Mrs. Dinsmore

References

Bibliography
 Goble, Alan. The Complete Index to Literary Sources in Film. Walter de Gruyter, 1999.

External links
 

1921 films
1921 mystery films
American silent feature films
American mystery films
American black-and-white films
Films directed by John B. O'Brien
1920s English-language films
1920s American films
Silent mystery films